Mount Wati is the highest mountain in West Nile. It is located in Terego District, near the border with Maracha. Ranges next to it include the Offude Hills. Rebels used to hide there and monitor advancing government soldiers. It is also reported to harbour big snakes that use lights for trapping prey at night. Its elevation is approximately 1250 meters above sea level.

Mythology surrounding Wati
Dribidu, the ancestor of all Lugbara people is believed, according to myths, to have settled there after being excommunicated from east of the Albert Nile. He saw smoke rising from near the mountain and on approaching the source found a woman cooking. He made her his wife, hence the Lugbara tribe started from Wati. Proverbs have also been created using Wati as a subject for describing wise ideas. Legend also tells of a small hill called Ojuqua that used to be in Madi, Uganda. Then one day, a huge flock of birds started to roost on the hill. These birds would spend the days consuming people's crops and then return to Ojuqua Hill to sleep at night. The people began to hate and curse the hill for bringing these birds to the land and destroying their crops. So one night, a rumbling was heard and the people of Madi awoke to find that Ojuqua was no longer there. The hill had moved to Terego during the night because it was afraid of the people who hated it. Ojuqua asked Mount Wati if he could stay in this land and Wati permitted it. So now the hill of Ojuqua stands under the protection of the shadow of Mount Wati

Arua District
Wati